Big Band Specials is a 1962 album by June Christy, with tracks arranged by Bill Holman, Shorty Rogers and husband Bob Cooper.

Track listing
 “You Came a Long Way from St. Louis” (John Benson Brooks, Bob Russell) - 2:16
 “Swingin’ On Nothin’” (Sy Oliver, Billy Moore) - 2:23
 “Is You Is Or Is You Ain't My Baby” (Billy Austin, Louis Jordan) - 2:46
 “Prelude to a Kiss” (Duke Ellington, Irving Mills, Irving Gordon) - 3:54
 “Skyliner” (Charlie Barnet as Dale Bannett) - 3:01
 “A Night in Tunisia” (Dizzy Gillespie, Jon Hendricks) - 2:50
 “It Don’t Mean a Thing” (Duke Ellington, Irving Mills) - 1:43
 “Frenesi” (Alberto Dominguez, Ray Charles, Bob Russell) - 2:20
 “Stompin' at the Savoy” (Edgar Sampson, Chick Webb, Benny Goodman, Andy Razaf) - 2:30
 “Goodbye” (Gordon Jenkins) - 3:04
 “Time Was (Duerme)” (Miguel Prado, Gabriel Luna, Bob Russell) - 2:54
 “Until (The Mole)” ( LeRoy Holmes, Harry James, Hal David) - 2:47

Musicians
 June Christy - vocals 
 Conte Candoli - trumpet 
 Lee Katzman - trumpet 
 Al Porcino - trumpet 
 Ray Triscari - trumpet 
 Vern Friley - trombone
 Lew McCreary - trombone 
 Frank Rosolino - trombone
 John Halliburton - trombone 
 Dick Nash - trombone 
 Kenny Shroyer - bass trombone
 Joe Maini - also saxophone
 Bud Shank (as Bud Legge) - alto saxophone
 Charlie Kennedy - alto saxophone 
 Bob Cooper - tenor saxophone 
 Bill Perkins - tenor saxophone
 Jack Nimitz - baritone saxophone 
 Jimmy Rowles -  piano 
 Joe Mondragon - bass guitar
 Mel Lewis - drums
 Bob Cooper - arranger (track 12) 
 Shorty Rogers - arranger (tracks 1, 4 & 11)
 Bill Holman - arranger (all other tracks)

Tracks 3, 6, 7
Recorded Capitol Tower, Hollywood, 25 October 1962

Tracks 9, 10, 12
Recorded Capitol Tower, Hollywood, 5 November 1962

Tracks 1, 2, 4, 5, 8, 11
Recorded Capitol Tower, Hollywood, 19 November 1962

References

1962 albums
June Christy albums
albums arranged by Bob Cooper (musician)
albums arranged by Shorty Rogers
Capitol Records albums